Hilbert Spectroscopy uses Hilbert transforms to analyze broad spectrum signals from gigahertz to terahertz frequency radio. One suggested use is to quickly analyze liquids inside airport passenger luggage.

References

Spectroscopy
Signal processing
Security technology